Dunsville is a village in the Metropolitan Borough of Doncaster, South Yorkshire, England, in the civil parish of Hatfield. It lies on the A18 road between Hatfield and Edenthorpe.

Geography
It was historically part of the West Riding of Yorkshire and it was very close to the historic border of Yorkshire and Lincolnshire.

External links

Dunsville on Google Maps
Dunsville history

Villages in Doncaster